This is a list of Tamil language films produced in the Tamil cinema in India that were released in 2014.

Post-amendment to the Tamil Nadu Entertainment Tax Act 1939 on 27 September 2011, Gross jumped to 130 per cent of Nett for films with non-Tamil titles and U certificates as well. Commercial Taxes Department disclosed 82.97 crore in entertainment tax revenue for the year.

Box office collection 
The highest-grossing Kollywood films released in 2014, by worldwide box office gross revenue, are as follows.

Top film lists

Critics
The Hindu listed a list of their top 20 films in December 2014, revealing the following ventures "stood out": Appuchi Gramam, Arima Nambi, Burma, Goli Soda, Inam, Jeeva, Jigarthanda, Kathai Thiraikathai Vasanam Iyakkam, Madras, Nedunchaalai, Nerungi Vaa Muthamidathe, Oru Kanniyum Moonu Kalavaanikalum, Pisaasu, Poriyaalan, Saivam, Thegidi, Thirudan Police, Vaayai Moodi Pesavum, Velaiyilla Pattathari.

Sify.com listed their pick of top 15 films in December 2014, "purely based on the content and quality of the films": Cuckoo, Goli Soda, Inam, Jeeva, Jigarthanda, Kaaviya Thalaivan, Kathai Thiraikathai Vasanam Iyakkam, Madras, Mundasupatti, Oru Kanniyum Moonu Kalavaanikalum, Pisaasu, Saivam, Sathuranga Vettai, Thegidi, Vaayai Moodi Pesavum.

Indiaglitz.com picked a list of 12 film which were "appreciated well for its content and also made profits for everyone, who involved in the trade": Aranmanai, Arima Nambi, Goli Soda, Jigarthanda, Kaththi, Madras, Mundasupatti, Naaigal Jaakirathai, Sathuranga Vettai, Thegidi, Veeram, Velaiyilla Pattathari, Yaamirukka Bayamey.

Released films

January - June

July - December

Awards

Notable deaths

References

Tamil
2014
Tamil
2010s Tamil-language films